Louisiana Highway 37 (LA 37) is a  north-south state highway in Louisiana, United States, extending from Wooddale Boulevard in Baton Rouge to Louisiana Highway 10 in Greensburg. In East Baton Rouge Parish, the highway is named Greenwell Springs Road.

Route description
From the southwest, LA 37 begins just west of a cloverleaf interchange with US 61/US 190 in the city of Baton Rouge.  The highway heads northeast along Greenwell Springs Road and, about a mile after exiting the city limits, curves northward.  Now running parallel with the Amite River, LA 37 begins a concurrency with LA 64 that lasts through much of Central, a newer city that encompasses smaller communities such as Greenwell Springs.  North of Central, LA 37 follows the west bank of the Amite River until sharing a bridge across the river with LA 63.  After a short distance, LA 37 leaves the river's path and heads northeast through rural St. Helena Parish to its terminus at LA 10 in Greensburg.

Major junctions

References

0037
Transportation in East Baton Rouge Parish, Louisiana
Transportation in East Feliciana Parish, Louisiana
Transportation in St. Helena Parish, Louisiana